The UNECE Convention on Access to Information, Public Participation in Decision-making and Access to Justice in Environmental Matters, usually known as the Aarhus Convention, was signed on 25 June 1998 in the Danish city of Aarhus. It entered into force on 30 October 2001. As of March 2014, it had 47 parties—46 states and the European Union. All of the ratifying states are in Europe and Central Asia. The EU has begun applying Aarhus-type principles in its legislation, notably the Water Framework Directive (Directive 2000/60/EC). Liechtenstein and Monaco have signed the convention but have not ratified it.

The Aarhus Convention grants the public rights regarding access to information, public participation and access to justice, in governmental decision-making processes on matters concerning the local, national and transboundary environment. It focuses on interactions between the public and public authorities.

Content 
The Aarhus Convention is a multilateral environmental agreement through which the opportunities for citizens to access environmental information are increased and transparent and reliable regulation procedure is secured.
It is a way of enhancing the environmental governance network, introducing a reactive and trustworthy relationship between civil society and governments and adding the novelty of a mechanism created to empower the value of public participation in the decision-making process and guarantee access to justice: a "governance-by-disclosure" that leads a shift toward an environmentally responsible society. 
The Aarhus Convention was drafted by governments, with the highly required participation of NGOs, and is legally binding for all the States who ratified it becoming Parties. Among the latter is included the EC, who therefore has the task to ensure compliance not only within the member States but also for its institutions, all those bodies who carry out public administrative duties.
Each Party has the commitment to promote the principles contained in the convention and to fill out a national report, always embracing a consultative and transparent process

General features 
The Aarhus Convention is a rights-based approach: the intent is for the public to have awareness of the procedures for participation in environmental decision-making, have free access to them and
know how to use them.

A distinction is made between "the public", all the civil society's actors, and the "public concerned" precisely, those persons or organisations affected or interested in environmental decision-making (e.g. environmental NGOs).
"Public authorities" are the addressees of the convention, namely, governments, international institutions, and privatized bodies that have public responsibilities or act under the control of public bodies. The private sector, for which information disclosure depends on voluntary, non- mandatory practices, and bodies acting in a judicial or legislative capacity, are excluded.

Other significant provisions are the "non-discrimination" principle (all the information has to be provided without taking account of the nationality or citizenship of the applicant), the international nature of the convention, and the importance attributed to the promotion of environmental education of the public.

The Three Pillars 
 Access to information: any citizen should have the right to get a wide and easy access to environmental information. Public authorities must provide all the information required and collect and disseminate them and in a timely and transparent manner. They can refuse to do it only under particular situations (such as national defence); UNECE, 2006
 Public participation in decision making: the public must be informed over all the relevant projects and it has to have the chance to participate during the decision-making and legislative process. Decision makers can take advantage from people's knowledge and expertise; this contribution is a strong opportunity to improve the quality of the environmental decisions, outcomes and to guarantee procedural legitimacy
 Access to justice: the public has the right to judicial or administrative recourse procedures in case a Party violates or fails to adhere to environmental law and the convention's principles.

Further reflections 
The Aarhus convention is a "proceduralisation of the environmental regulation", it focuses more on setting and listing procedures rather than establishing standards and specifying outcomes, permitting the parties involved to interpret and implement the convention on the systems and circumstances that characterize their nation. This model embodies a perfect example of a multi-level governance.

The risk could lay in a loss of time and resources that could be otherwise invested in defining the outcomes, notwithstanding the fact that it renders the convention vague, weak and open to multiple interpretations.
Other critiques note the fact that private bodies are excluded from the mandatory procedures (Mason, 2010), and that, moreover, it can also be debated whether the NGOs involved are faithfully representing environmental interests, ordinary citizens often do not have the financial means to participate effectively and are therefore have no choice but to be represented by these larger organisations. The relative differences between the participants and social groups' resource inequalities also suggests the possibility for irregular and imbalanced environmental protection.

Compliance Committee 
The Aarhus Convention Compliance Committee was established to fulfill the requirement of Article 15 of the convention on review of compliance to establish arrangements for reviewing compliance with the convention.

The convention has a unique Compliance Review Mechanism, which can be triggered in four ways: 
 a Party makes a submission concerning its own compliance,
 a Party makes a submission concerning another Party's compliance,
 the Convention Secretariat makes a referral to the committee, or
 a member of the public makes a communication concerning the compliance of a Party.
The Compliance mechanism is unique in international environmental law, as it allows members of the public to communicate concerns about a Party's compliance directly to a committee of international legal experts empowered to examine the merits of the case (the Aarhus Convention Compliance Committee). Nonetheless, the Compliance Committee cannot issue binding decisions, but rather makes recommendations to the full Meeting of the Parties (MoP). However, in practice, as MoPs occur infrequently, Parties attempt to comply with the recommendations of the Compliance Committee. As of August 2009, 41 communication from the public – many originating with non-governmental organizations – and one submission from a Party had been lodged with the convention's Compliance Committee.

Pollutant Release Protocol 
The Kyiv Protocol on Pollutant Release and Transfer Registers to the Aarhus Convention was adopted at an extraordinary meeting of the Parties on 21 May 2003, in Kyiv, Ukraine. 36 States and the European Community signed the Protocol. As of May 2016, 34 states plus the European Union have ratified the Protocol.

The Kyiv Protocol is the first legally binding international instrument on Pollutant Release and Transfer Registers (PRTRs). PRTRs are inventories of pollution from industrial sites and other sources such as agriculture and transport. The objective of the Protocol is "to enhance public access to information through the establishment of coherent, nationwide pollutant release and transfer registers (PRTRs)." The Protocol places indirect obligations on private enterprises to report annually to their national governments on their releases and transfers of pollutants.

Parties to the Protocol need not be Parties to the convention. The Protocol is in this sense a free-standing, international agreement. The Kiev Protocol on PRTRs will enter into force 90 days after the sixteenth State ratifies or accedes to the agreement.

An amendment to the Aarhus Convention on "Public Participation in Decisions on Deliberate Release into the Environment and Placing on the Market of Genetically Modified Organisms" was adopted at the Second Meeting of the Parties on 27 May 2005, in Almaty, Kazakhstan. As of August 2009, it had been ratified by 21 countries. The GMO amendment will enter into force 90 days after at least three-quarters of the Parties to the Aarhus Convention ratify it.

United Nations Secretary-General Kofi Annan (1997–2006) has said, "Although regional in scope, the significance of the Aarhus Convention is global. It is by far the most impressive elaboration of principle 10 of the Rio Declaration, which stresses the need for citizens' participation in environmental issues and for access to information on the environment held by public authorities. As such it is the most ambitious venture in the area of environmental democracy so far undertaken under the auspices of the United Nations."

The influence of the Aarhus Convention also extends beyond the environmental field. At the 2nd Internet Governance Forum, held on 12–15 May 2007, in Rio de Janeiro, the convention was presented as a model of public participation and transparency in the operation of international forums.

See also
Freedom of information legislation
Participatory monitoring
Action for Climate Empowerment

References

External links
 UNECE Aarhus Convention website
 UNECE Aarhus Convention Clearinghouse website
 Case Law of the Aarhus Convention Compliance Committee (2004–2008)
 2nd Edition of the Case Law of the Aarhus Convention Compliance Committee (2004–2011)
 For the Second Meeting of the Parties to the Aarhus Convention. 2005
 For the Third Meeting of the Parties to the Aarhus Convention. 2008 
 For the Fourth Meeting of the Parties to the Aarhus Convention. 2011
 For the Fifth Meeting of the Parties to the Aarhus Convention. 2014
 The Aarhus Convention: A Legal Guide

Pollutant release inventories and registers
Environmental treaties
United Nations Economic Commission for Europe treaties
Treaties concluded in 1998
Treaties entered into force in 2001
2001 in the environment
Freedom of information legislation
Treaties of Albania
Treaties of Armenia
Treaties of Austria
Treaties of Azerbaijan
Treaties of Belarus
Treaties of Belgium
Treaties of Bosnia and Herzegovina
Treaties of Bulgaria
Treaties of Croatia
Treaties of Cyprus
Treaties of the Czech Republic
Treaties of Denmark
Treaties of Estonia
Treaties of Finland
Treaties of France
Treaties of Georgia (country)
Treaties of Germany
Treaties of Greece
Treaties of Hungary
Treaties of Iceland
Treaties of Ireland
Treaties of Italy
Treaties of Kazakhstan
Treaties of Latvia
Treaties of Lithuania
Treaties of Luxembourg
Treaties of Malta
Treaties of Montenegro
Treaties of the Netherlands
Treaties of Norway
Treaties of Poland
Treaties of Portugal
Treaties of Moldova
Treaties of Romania
Treaties of Serbia
Treaties of Slovakia
Treaties of Slovenia
Treaties of Spain
Treaties of Sweden
Treaties of Switzerland
Treaties of Tajikistan
Treaties of North Macedonia
Treaties of Turkmenistan
Treaties of Ukraine
Treaties of the United Kingdom
Treaties of Kyrgyzstan
Treaties entered into by the European Union
1998 in Denmark